Mihai Corneliu Drăgănescu (October 6, 1929 – May 28, 2010) was a Romanian engineer who served as President of the Romanian Academy from 1990 to 1994.

Born in Făget, Prahova County, he received a B.Sc. in 1952 and a Ph.D. in 1957 from Politehnica University of Bucharest. He married  in 1957. He joined the faculty of Politehnica University in 1951, becoming a professor in 1965. In 1974, he became a corresponding member of the Romanian Academy, rising to titular member in January 1990, following the Romanian Revolution. Later that year, he became the academy's president, serving until 1994 and initiating its transition into the post-communist environment. In the first cabinet of Petre Roman, in 1989–1990, he was a deputy prime minister. He co-authored several publications with Menas Kafatos, including the book Principles of Integrative Science (Editura Tehnică, 2003).

In 1971, he was made a commander of the Legion of Honour, attaining the same rank in the Order of the Star of Romania in 2000. He was buried at Bellu Cemetery.

The Research Institute for Artificial Intelligence of the Romanian Academy, set up in 1994, is named after him.

Notes

References
  Ștefan Iancu, Mihai Drăgănescu – Promotor al revoluției informatice în România, in Studii și comunicări, History of Science Division of the Romanian Academy, vol. V (2012), pp. 113–131

1929 births
2010 deaths
People from Prahova County
Romanian engineers
Academic staff of the Politehnica University of Bucharest
Deputy Prime Ministers of Romania
Presidents of the Romanian Academy
Honorary members of the Academy of Sciences of Moldova
Commanders of the Order of the Star of Romania
Commandeurs of the Légion d'honneur
Burials at Bellu Cemetery
Politehnica University of Bucharest alumni